Giuseppe Toaldo (Pianezze, 11 November 1719 - Padua, 11 July 1797) was an Italian Catholic priest and physicist.

Biography 
Giuseppe Toaldo was born in 1719 in Pianezza near Vicenza. 

In his fourteenth year he entered the seminary of Padua, in which he subsequently taught mathematics and Italian literature. While connected with the seminary he edited the works of Galileo (1744), for which he wrote an appreciative preface and critical notes. In this edition, for the first time since Galileo Galilei's condemnation, it was published with ecclesiastical approval the Dialogue Concerning the Two Chief World Systems. 

In 1754 he was appointed pastor of Montegalda; and, eight years later, was called to the chair of astronomy in the University of Padua. Toaldo, like his contemporaries, Divisch and Giovanni Battista Beccaria (both priests), gave special attention to the study of atmospheric electricity and to the means of protecting buildings against lightning. He advocated the erection of lightning rods, adopting the views of Benjamin Franklin on their preventive and protective action, rather than those of the French school led by Abbé Nollet. His treatise "Della maniera di difendere gli edificii dal fulmine" (1772) and his pamphlet "Dei conduttori metallici a preservazione degli edifici dal fulmine" (1774) contributed largely to remove the popular prejudices of the time against the use of the "Franklinian rod"; and through his exertions lightning-conductors were placed on Siena Cathedral, on the tower of St. Mark's, Venice, on powder magazines, and ships of the Venetian navy. 

Toaldo was a member of many of the learned bodies of Europe, notably of the Royal Society, London. The asteroid 23685 Toaldo is named for him.

See also
List of Roman Catholic cleric–scientists

References

Works

External links
 
 

1719 births
1797 deaths
People from the Province of Vicenza
Italian meteorologists
18th-century  Italian physicists
Catholic clergy scientists
Fellows of the Royal Society
Academic staff of the University of Padua